Henry of Bar may refer to:

Henry I, Count of Bar (r. 1170–1190)
Henry II, Count of Bar (r. 1214–1239)
Henry III, Count of Bar (r. 1291–1302)
Henry IV, Count of Bar (r. 1336–1344)
Henry of Bar (d. 1397), marquis de Pont-à-Mousson